Rosay may refer to the following communes in France:

Rosay, Jura, in the Jura département
Rosay, Seine-Maritime, in the Seine-Maritime département
Rosay, Yvelines, in the Yvelines département
Rosay-sur-Lieure, in the Eure département
Rosay, the nickname of Rose Dougall of the British band The Pipettes
Rosay, the nickname of Miami native rapper Rick Ross.

See also
Rosé